Elizabeth Joan Winch (14 August 1930 – 6 September 2018), known professionally as Liz Fraser, was a British film actress, best known for being cast in provocative comedy roles.

Early life
Fraser was born in Southwark, London. Her year of birth was usually cited as 1933, which she gave when auditioning for her role in I'm All Right Jack, because the Boulting Brothers wanted someone younger for the part. In fact she was three years older, as she confirmed in her autobiography, Liz Fraser ... and Other Characters, published by Signum Books in 2012. Her father was a travelling salesman for a brewery and her mother owned a corner shop just off the New Kent Road. Their family life was disrupted by the Second World War, when she was evacuated, initially to Westerham in Kent and then, when that was deemed still too vulnerable to bombing, to Chudleigh, a village in Devon. Her father died in May 1942, aged 40, when she was 11.

She went to St Saviour's and St Olave's Grammar School for Girls between the ages of 13 and 17. She then attended evening courses at Goldsmiths College, where she joined a drama group, and the City of London College for Commerce, Book-Keeping, Shorthand and Typing, and won an evening scholarship to the London School of Dramatic Art.

Career 
Her first film appearance was in Touch and Go (1955), using her birth name, and The Smallest Show on Earth (1957) in which she worked with Peter Sellers for the first time. Fraser also appeared in commercial television's first live play The Geranium for Associated-Rediffusion. She made an uncredited appearance as June in Alive and Kicking (1959),  Her breakthrough role was as the daughter of Sellers' character in I'm All Right Jack (1959), for which she received a BAFTA nomination as Most Promising Newcomer. She was in several of the early Carry On films: Carry On Regardless (1961), Carry On Cruising (1962), and Carry On Cabby (1963), but was sacked by producer Peter Rogers after casually saying the series could be better marketed. She re-appeared in the series in Carry On Behind (1975), her salary apparently half of what it had been before.

Her other film appearances include Desert Mice (1959), Two-Way Stretch (1960), again with Sellers, The Bulldog Breed (1960), Double Bunk (1961) Raising the Wind (1961), On the Fiddle (1961), The Painted Smile (1962), The Americanization of Emily (1964), The Family Way (1966), Up the Junction (1968), Dad's Army (1971), and a string of sex comedies: Adventures of a Taxi Driver (1976), Confessions of a Driving Instructor (1976), Adventures of a Private Eye (1977), Confessions from a Holiday Camp (1977) and Rosie Dixon – Night Nurse (1978).

Fraser was also known for her many appearances in British television series, including Hancock's Half Hour, and the Avengers episode "The Girl from Auntie" where she guest starred opposite Carry On regular Bernard Cribbins. As Elizabeth Fraser, over a period of nearly six months, she appeared in numerous editions of the Associated-Rediffusion soap opera Sixpenny Corner (1955–56). She appeared on Benny Hill's late-1950s TV shows, and in a single sketch in the 23 December 1970 episode of his Thames TV series. This episode was in black and white (owing to the "Colour Strike" by ITV technicians, who wanted to be paid extra for working with the then-new colour TV technology), and hence the sketch was not included in any of the half-hour syndicated episodes of The Benny Hill Show. However, it is included in the Volume 1 box set of the complete Benny Hill Show, issued by A&E and Fremantle.

Fraser also starred as Gloria Simpkins in the radio sitcom Parsley Sidings alongside Arthur Lowe and Kenneth Connor from 1971 to 1973.

She played Mrs Brent, the mother of a missing girl, in the television production of Agatha Christie's Nemesis, starring Joan Hickson as Miss Marple, in 1987. Another role was in the "Backtrack" episode of the British police series The Professionals, as Margery Harper, a glamorous woman who fenced stolen property in her shop.

Her other television work included Randall and Hopkirk (Deceased), Crown Court, Citizen James, Robin's Nest, Rumpole of the Bailey, Last of the Summer Wine, The Bill, Foyle's War, Birds of a Feather, Minder and Holby City.

Personal life and death
Fraser married Peter Yonwin, a travelling salesman, in November 1958, but the marriage soon broke down and they were divorced. She married her second husband, Bill Hitchcock, a TV director, in January 1965 at Harrow Register Office. They agreed not to work together, but this changed in 1972 when she appeared in the Rodney Bewes sitcom Albert!, which Hitchcock co-directed, and again later in the same year, when she acted in Turnbull's Finest Half-Hour, a comedy series starring Michael Bates and produced by Hitchcock. Hitchcock died from a pulmonary embolism in February 1974, at the age of 45. Fraser was diagnosed with breast cancer in 1978 and 1979, undergoing a lumpectomy the first time and having reconstructive surgery at the Marsden in 1979.

Fraser had a half-brother, Philip, 11 years older, the son of her mother from a previous marriage. She supported various charities and was a patron of the London Repertory Company. She was also an enthusiastic and talented poker and bridge player.

She died on 6 September 2018 at Royal Brompton Hospital as a result of complications following an operation.

Filmography

Television appearances
 Sixpenny Corner (1955) – Julie Perkins
 Hancock's Half Hour (1956-1960) – Various characters
 The Grove Family (1956)
 ITV Television Playhouse: "Two Ducks on a Pond" (1957) - Beryl
 Dixon of Dock Green (1957) - Jeannie Richards
 Shadow Squad (1957) - Gilda
 The Army Game (1957)
 Whack-O! (1957) - Matron
 Educated Evans (1957) – W.R.A.C. Clerk 
 Dixon of Dock Green (1958) - Maisie Perkins
 Hotel Imperial (1958)
 The Sky Larks (1958) - Rose
 Educating Archie (1958)
 Murder Bag (1958)
 Dixon of Dock Green (1958) - Lena
 No Hiding Place (1959) - Rose Glorie
 Boyd Q.C. (1959)
 ITV Play of the Week (1959) - Dora
 The Vise (1959) - Betsy Linton
 ITV Television Playhouse: "Incident" (1960) - Mavis
 Knight Errant Limited (1960) - Gloria MacLean
 BBC Sunday-Night Play (1960) - Riggie
 Citizen James (1960–1962) – Liz
 Probation Officer (1962) - Lorna
 No Hiding Place (1963) - Sheba
 Harry's Girls (1963) - Sally Witherspoon
 Fire Crackers (1964) - Mary Medway
 No Hiding Place (1965) - Phyllis Nolan
 It's Not Me: It's Them! (1965) - Mrs. Ember
 The Avengers: "The Girl from AUNTIE" (1966) – Georgie Price-Jones
 Seven Deadly Virtues (1967) - Agnes
 Mickey Dunne (1967) – Maisie
 Randall and Hopkirk (Deceased) (1969): "It's Supposed to be Thicker than Water" – Fay Crackan
 Here Come the Double Deckers! (1970) - Zizi Bagor
 The Goodies: "Caught in the Act" (1970) - Miss Heffer
 The Benny Hill Show (1970) - Various Roles
 BBC The World About Us - Under London Expedition (1971) - Herself
 ITV Sunday Night Theatre (1972) - Countess Antonescu
 Jason King (1972) - Claire
 Crime of Passion (1972) - Denise
 Dear Mother...Love Albert (1972) - Ann
 Turnbull's Finest Half-Hour (1972) – Faye Bush
 Crown Court (1973) - Lady Esham ('Murder Most Foul', episode)
 Seven Faces of Woman (1977) - Delilah Brown
 Rumpole of the Bailey (1978): "Rumpole and the Alternative Society" - Bobby Dogherty
 Robin's Nest (1978): "The Happy Hen" - Vera
 The Professionals: "Backtrack" (1979) – Margery Harper
 Shroud for a Nightingale (1984) – Sister Mavis Gearing
 Fairly Secret Army (1984–1986) – Doris Entwhistle
 Miss Marple: "Nemesis" (1987) – Mrs. Brent
 Hardwicke House (1987) - Agnes
 Rude Health (1988) - Mrs. Joy
 ScreenPlay (1988) - Mrs. Dewey
 The Lady and the Highwayman (1988) - Flossie
 Capstick's Law (1989) - Florence Smith
 Birds of a Feather: "Just Family" (1991) – Olive Stubbs
 Minder: "How to Succeed in Business Without Really Retiring" (1993) – Delilah
 Demob (1993) - Edith
 The Bill (1994) - Grace Walsh
 Wales Playhouse (1996) - Nel
 Drover's Gold (1997) - Ma Whistler
 Hold to Zero (2000) - Grace
 Last of the Summer Wine (2000) – Reggie Unsworth
 Pickles: The Dog Who Won the World Cup (2006) - Ada
 Doctors (2006) – Beryl Gifford
 Foyle's War (2007) – Mollie Summersgill
 Holby City (2007) – Tabitha Blackstock
 Midsomer Murders: "Till Death Do Us Part" (2018) – Marcia Jackson

References

Sources
 Simon Sheridan Keeping the British End Up: Four Decades of Saucy Cinema, Titan Books (2011, 4th edition);

External links
 Liz Fraser at the British Film Institute
 
 Official website of the Carry On films

1930 births
2018 deaths
People from Southwark
Alumni of Goldsmiths, University of London
English film actresses
English stage actresses
English television actresses
Actresses from London
20th-century English actresses
21st-century English actresses